The Bhambi Sindhi  Mochi are a Hindu caste found in the state of Gujarat in India. They are also known as Sindhi Mochi. The Bhambi Sindhi Mochi are sub-group within the Bhambi community.

Origin 

The community is said to have originated from Sindh, from where they migrated to Gujarat. In most Indian languages, the word mochi means a cobbler, and they were the traditional cobblers of Gujarat. They are now found mainly in Ahmadabad, and Kheda districts. The Bhambhi now speak Gujarat.

Present circumstances 

The Sindhi Mochi are an endogamous community and practice clan exogamy. Their main clans are the Parmar, Solanki, Baghela, Rathore, Gohil and Chauhan. All these are also well known Rajput clans.

The majority of Sindhi Mochi are still employed as shoemakers. A majority are now employed as wage labourers. They are a Hindu community, and their tribal deity is Chamunda.

See also 

Bhambi Rohit
Bhambi Khalpa

References

Social groups of Gujarat
Indian castes
Tribal communities of Gujarat
Scheduled Tribes of India
Sindhi tribes
Sindhi tribes in India